A glare is a facial expression showing disapproval, fierceness and/or hostility. Glaring, in some cultures is considered offensive. A glare may be induced by anger or frustration. 

Visually, a glaring person tends to have their eyes fixed and heavily focused on a subject. This can sometimes be considered synonymous to staring but, in most of the cases, staring is caused due to curiosity and lasts only for a short duration, whereas glaring is caused due to contempt and lasts for a relatively longer duration.

Many people glare at a subject to express disapproval of the physical nature of the subject or ideas that may be expressed by the subject.

See also 
 Frown
 Inattention
 Smile

External links

Facial expressions